The Beit Yaacov/Rabi Meyr Synagogue is the current synagogue of the Jewish Community of Manaus, Amazonas, Brazil. Founded in 1962, this Traditional Judaism congregation is one of the largest and most influential synagogues of Amazonian Jews in the Northern Brazil. The Jewish Labour Zionist youth movement Habonim Dror is established in Manaus and it is part of the Community. The construction was financed by the local entrepreneurs Isaac Benayon Sabbá, Samuel Benchimol, José Benzecry and Moysés Benarrós Israel.

Service Times
Beit Yaacov/Rabi Meyr Synagogue conducts weekly Friday night and Saturday morning, Shabat services. Services are generally at 6:30 p.m. on Friday evening and 9:00 a.m. on Saturday morning. The Synagogue also offers services throughout each holiday including Rosh Hashanah, Yom Kippur and Pessach.

The Community also celebrates Yom Ha'Atzmaut, Yom HaShoah, Yom Hazikaron, Yom Yerushalayim, Mimouna and the Hilulot, celebrations linked to the commemoration of great rabbis and tzadikim of Morocco.

For security reasons, Jewish tourists and groups of Jewish tourists (with or without guide) wishing to participate in the religious services of the Synagogue must inform the Community in advance.

History
About 900 miles inland from the Atlantic, Manaus is the capital of the state of Amazonas, in northwest Brazil. Of the city's 2.0 million people, roughly 800 are Jewish, according to Isaac Dahan, the local synagogue's cantor.

The Jewish community of Manaus dates from about 1890, when Jews were fleeing poverty and uncertain life in Morocco and when Brazil was experiencing a rubber boom. The smuggling of seeds for rubber trees out of Brazil to England in 1876 and the successful planting of seedlings in Indonesia and Ceylon eventually helped cause the bubble to burst.

The 'Jewish Saint'
In 1908, following instructions from then Chief Rabbi of Morocco, Rephael Ancáua, Rabbi Shalom Imanuel Muyal traveled to Amazon in order to verify the situation of hundreds of families of Moroccan Jews which started emigrating in 1810.

In 1910, Rabbi Shalom Imanuel Muyal died of yellow fever and is buried in the Manaus Catholic Cemetery. He has come to be regarded as a saint by many in the local non-Jewish population, who make regular pilgrimages to his gravesite.

Local Christians in the Amazonian city have made it a tradition to turn up at Muyal's burial spot in the Saint John the Baptist Cemetery to pray for miracles. When their prayers are answered, they put up small signs of thanks.

References

External links

 Christians in Manaus Pray to the 'Jewish Saint' - ABC News
 The Jews of Manaus - The New York Times

1962 establishments in Brazil
Moroccan diaspora
Jewish organizations established in 1962
Sephardi Jewish culture in Brazil
Sephardi synagogues
Spanish Brazilian
Synagogues in Brazil
Moroccan-Jewish diaspora
Spanish-Jewish diaspora
Zionism in Brazil
Union for Traditional Judaism